Ward 7 is a ward of Vũng Tàu in Bà Rịa–Vũng Tàu province, Vietnam. Located 3km north of the Front Beach, this ward was created in 1986 following the dissolution of the former Thang Nhi Ward.

As of 1999, the ward had a population of 21,759, and the total density of 13.349 people per km².

History 
Under the reign of king Gia Long (1761–1820), when Malay pirates built a base here and subsequently became a danger to traders in Gia Định city, the king sent his army to crack down on the pirates. The pirates were ousted and the troops were given the land as a reward. They settled in three villages namely: Thắng Nhứt, Thắng Nhì and Thắng Tam. Ward 7 lies at the southeastern part of Thắng Nhì village.

After successfully crushing the Nguyễn forces and capturing Cochinchine, the French developed Vung Tau into a defense base for the colonial government based in Saigon. The section of Route de Ben-dinh (Lê Lợi Street today) was occupied by military barracks and facilities, such as infantry, artillery and military hospital run by French and indigenous forces.

After the Geneva Accords, the Armed Forces of the Republic of Vietnam and its US allies took over these barracks and developed more training facilities in area located in the present day Nguyen Thai Hoc Street.

After the reunification of Vietnam, Vung Tau was made a hub of Vietnam's new oil and gas industry. In order to host more than 20,000 Soviet petroleum engineers and specialists, the government assigned an exclusive residential area in what is now Vietsovpetro living quarter, also known locally as "Khu Năm Tầng" (Five Storey Zone).

In 1986, the Council of Ministers decided that the five wards of Vũng Tàu - Côn Đảo Special Zone would be rearranged into 11 new wards, numbered from 1 to 11. Ward 7 was, therefore, created out of Thắng Nhì Ward.

Administrative divisions 
The ward was divided into 9 quarters, numbered from 1 to 9.

Education 
The ward lies in the school zones of four primary schools (Lê Lợi, Quang Trung, Nguyễn Thái Học and Bùi Thị Xuân), and five secondary shools (Duy Tân, Trần Phú, Thắng Nhì, Võ Trường Toản and Nguyễn Văn Linh). Among these, only Lê Lợi Primary and Trần Phú Secondary Schools are based in the ward.

Religion 

 Tân Châu Catholic Church is the only christian church in the ward, located at the northwestern neighbourhood of the ward. It was established in 1970 after breakup from Vung Tau Parish.
 Located near the church is Temple to Emperor Guan, a Chinese folk place of worship run by the local Teochew Hoa community.
 Kim Liên Pagoda.

References

Communes of Bà Rịa-Vũng Tàu province
Populated places in Bà Rịa-Vũng Tàu province